Nukualofa is the capital and largest city of Tonga. It is located on the north coast of the island of Tongatapu, in the country's southernmost island group.

History

First western records of Nukualofa
On 10 June 1777, British captain James Cook wrote of his arrival at their anchorage place. His description of the place confirmed, with his map, that this was the bay of Nukualofa.

Cook never used the name Nukualofa or any other spelling for the reports of this voyage, but he mentioned the island of Pangaimodoo (Pangaimotu) which was to the east of his anchorage position. Captain Cook also wrote that he travelled by canoes to visit Mooa (Mua) where Paulaho and other great men lived. The house that Paulaho provided was on the beach  from the ship. Reference to his map shows that he must have landed and stayed in the Siesia area, the eastern part of modern Nukualofa. Cook also drafted the first map of the bay of Nukuʻalofa.

The first written record for Nukuʻalofa is stated in the first dedicated book for Tonga by George Vason which was published in 1810. George Vason was an English missionary from the London Missionary Society, who arrived in Tonga in 1797. George Vason wrote of their arrival that:

"Before we could well come to an anchor, the ship was surrounded by the natives, who flocked to us from every adjacent Island. The place, before which we anchored, was called Noogollefa: it was near an Island, named Bonghy-moddoo; on which former navigators pitched their tents, as a convenient spot, on account of its separation from the main Island, to preserve themselves from being too much incommoded by the natives."

That was the first mention of Nukuʻalofa, spelled as Noogoollefa. Vason's unusual spelling of Nukuʻalofa and Pangaimotu (as "Bonghy-Moddoo") was because the standard Tongan alphabet would not be developed until 1826–27.

The second oldest book dedicated to Tonga was by William Mariner, adopted son of Fīnau ʻUlukālala, which was published in 1817. Mariner described his experiences during the years he was the adopted son of ʻUlukālala (1806–1810). He described the civil war and the siege of the Fort of Nukuʻalofa, which fell to ʻUlukālala and his warriors.

The third attempt of Christian missionaries was recorded in April 1826, when two Tahitian London Missionaries were detained by Tupou the chief of Nukuʻalofa.

In March 1826, the four men left Tahiti in the Minerva, their destination Fiji. But at Nukuʻalofa, Tonga, their plans were disrupted by the high chief Tupou (Aleamotuʻa). From Davies' perspective the Tahitian were placed under detention at Tongatapu: “The chief called Tupou would not let them proceed. He had been himself a resident in Lageba and calls himself the friend of Tuineau, the chief of Lageba and as such he took possession of the present intended for the Fijian chief".

The arrival of the Methodist missionaries in Nukuʻalofa in 1827 reinforced the Christian faith. The persecution suffered by Christians in Hihifo and Hahake forced a lot of people to seek refuge in Nukuʻalofa. As a result of the encouragement of Tupou, the King of Nukuʻalofa, this was the beginning of the expanding of Nukuʻalofa to become the major center of Christianity in Tonga.

The US Exploring Expedition met with King Josiah (Aleamotuʻa) in 1840.

The final phase of the arrival of Christianity in Tonga was the arrival of Father Chevron, or Patele Sevelo, in 1842. He wrote that he arrived in Nukuʻalofa in 1842 and met the Tuʻi Kanokupolu Aleamotuʻa who was baptised by the Wesleyan as Sosaia.

In conclusion, these landings turned Nukuʻalofa from a small village and fort into the center of Tonga during the introduction of Christianity. From the earliest records for Nukuʻalofa, early writers always referred to the settlement as Noogollefa (1797), Nioocalofa (1806), Nukualofa (1826 by Methodist) and Noukou-Alofa (1842 by French Catholic priests). There was no other mention of any other name of the settlement other than the settlement or fort of Nukuʻalofa.

Capital of the Kingdom of Tonga (1875 and later)

The Declaration of the Constitution of Tonga in 1875 formalised Nukuʻalofa as the Capital of Tonga. King George Taufaʻahau Tupou I issued the Constitution of Tonga on 4 November 1875, in Nukuʻalofa. The Constitution also stated (Article 38) that the Parliament will meet in Nukuʻalofa except in time of war.

Since Nukuʻalofa has been expanding from when it became the center of Christianity in Tonga in the 19th century, it became essential that it was reorganised for effective administration of the capital. The reorganisation of Nukuʻalofa divided up Nukuʻalofa into three major district areas:

 Kolomotuʻa (Kolo meaning "town" or "settlement", motuʻa meaning "old"), encompassing the city's original settlement at the old fort of Nukualofa, including the area of Tavatuʻutolu (Longolongo), Sopu ʻo Vave (now Sopu ʻo Taufaʻahau), Tongataʻeapa, Tufuenga, Kapeta and all the western area where it was the traditional settlement of the Tuʻi Kanokupolu from Mumui the 13th Tuʻi Kanokupolu to Aleamotuʻa the 18th Tuʻi Kanokupolu.
 Kolofoʻou (foʻou meaning "new"). This area started from the Vahaʻakolo Road and all the eastern side to Maʻufanga which include the Palace of King George Taufaʻahau Tupou I and seat of Government, as well as all the new settlement of Fasi moe Afi ʻa Tungi, Malie Taha (One Mile), Ngeleʻia was an old settlement during the civil wars and Taufaʻahau and his warriors destroy this settlement. Taufaʻahau settled in his kau Toʻa Tautahi (Sea-Warlords) in Nukuʻalofa for his protection and security from enemies and named the area Kolofoʻou (Newtown or Newsettling). This happened after the burn down and fall of Takai's fortress of Pea in the command of his son Moeakiola in 1852. About the same time Taufaʻahau moved his capital to Kolofoʻou, Nukuʻalofa after he ruled and reigned from Pangai, Haʻapai since 1845.
 Maʻufanga, on the eastern side of Nukualofa. Maʻufanga was an old village of the Haʻa Takalaua, which is the Estate of the Chief Fakafanua, now ruled by the Uhamaka family. George Vason mentioned that Maʻufanga was a refugees area during the civil war, where people could take shelter in time of hardship.

21st century 
In 2006, lack of progress towards democracy resulted in riots in Nuku'Alofa. During the riots, much of the central business district was burned down. 

The capital city was struck by the tsunami caused by the 2022 Hunga Tonga–Hunga Ha'apai eruption. There is reportedly significant damage to the capital. The damage might take years to repair.

Government

The national government is based in Nukualofa. The parliament of Tonga meets there, and the Royal Palace is located near the city.

The name is said to have originated when Moungatonga, the 6th Tui Haatakalaua (King who governs the daily business of Tonga on behalf of the Tui Tonga or Sacred King of Tonga) sent his youngest son, Ngata (later to be 1st Tui Kanokupolu) as governor to Hihifo (Western side of Tongatapu). It was a difficult decision for Ngata as the Tuʻi Tonga and Tuʻi Haʻatakalaua have been unable to control Hihifo. Ngata had many reasons to fear for his life as his predecessors had been killed by the chiefs and people of Hihifo.

Between 12 and 13 February 2018, the Tongan Parliament House was destroyed by Cyclone Gita, a category 4 cyclone that hit the nation.

Climate
Nukuʻalofa features a tropical rainforest climate (Af) under the Köppen climate classification. The area does experience noticeably wetter and drier periods during the year, but it does not have a true dry season month where monthly precipitation falls below . As the trade winds are almost permanent and cyclones are not rare in Nukuʻalofa, the climate is not equatorial but maritime trade-wind tropical climate.

Economy

Nukualofa is the economic hub of the country.

Peau Vavaʻu, an airline, had its head office in the Pacific Royale Hotel in Nukuʻalofa. The former Royal Tongan Airlines had its head office in the Royco Building in Nukualofa.

The city has markets and a central business district. Much of the central business district was destroyed during the 2006 Nukuʻalofa riots. Reconstruction started in 2008, funded by a US$55 million loan from China.

The city has a number of tourist hotels.

Transport

Nukualofa is the central hub for transport in Tonga.

Buses arrive and depart from the central bus station along Vuna Road close to the centre of town. Bus services are privately operated, and their drivers are free to set their own schedules. Fares are fixed by the government, with reduced rates for school children. The buses are usually filled to capacity. In addition, some schools and large hotels provide their own buses.

There are numerous taxis, also privately owned. Many people who own a car earn extra money by providing taxi services in their spare time. Taxi fares are also set by the government. Most families have their own car; few residents ride bicycles. There are no operational railways or trams in Tonga, although there was once a narrow-gauge railway from the lagoon to the wharf, which gave its name to Railway Road.

Nukualofa harbour is the only deep-water harbour of the island, which determined its selection as the site for the capital. For many years Vuna Wharf was the international harbour until it was destroyed by an earthquake in 1977. A new, much larger wharf was built towards Maufanga, named after Queen Sālote. Between these two wharves is the wharf numbered '42', used by fishermen and inter-island ferries. It is the central hub for boats to the outer islands. There are usually two boats to ʻEua each day and two to Haʻapai and Vavaʻu each week. In addition to these regular services by shipping companies, private boat owners provide less regular services to smaller islands such as Nomuka and ʻEueiki.

Air transport is provided by Fuaamotu International Airport on the south side of Tongatapu,  from Nukualofa.

2015 island creation
In January 2015, a new island of about  diameter was reported to have been created by a volcanic eruption of Hunga Tonga–Hunga Ha'apai. The newly formed island is situated about 65 kilometers (40 miles) northwest of the capital city.

Twin towns – sister cities

Nukuʻalofa is twinned with:
 Whitby, United Kingdom
 Majuro, Marshall Islands

Endnotes

References

 
 Vason G, An authentic of narrative of four years residence at one of the Friendly Islands, 1810
 Martin J, An account of the natives of the Tonga Islands, in the south pacific ocean. with an original grammar and vocabulary of their language. Compiled and arranged from the extensive communication of Mr William Mariner, several years resident in those islands, 1817
 Munro and Thornley, The convant makers: Islanders missionaries in the Pacific, 1996.
 Findlay and Holdworth, History of the Wesleyan Methodist Missionary Society Vol III, 1921
 Monfat A, Les Tonga; ou, Archipel des Amis et le R. P. Joseph Chevron de la Société de Marie, 1893
 Rowe Stringer G. A Pioneer, A Memoir of The Rev. John Thomas (1885)
 Farmer, Sarah Stock, Tonga and the Friendly Islands: With A Sketch of the Mission History, 1885
 Schütz, Albert J, The diaries and correspondence of David Cargill, by David Cargill, 1832–1843; 1937
 Garret John, To Live Among the Stars; Origin of Christianity in Oceania, 1982
 Elijah Hoole (ed.), Friendly and Feejee Islands: a missionary visit to various stations in them; by Walter Lawry, 1857
 Campbell, I.C. Island Kingdom: Tonga Ancient and Modern. Christchurch, 1992
 Gifford, Edward Winslow, Tongan Places Name, 1923

External links
 Transport and Industry

 
Populated places in Tonga
Capitals in Oceania
Port cities in Oceania